Joaquim Faria (14 July 1904 – 23 February 1977) was a Brazilian rower. He competed in the men's eight event at the 1932 Summer Olympics.

References

1904 births
1977 deaths
Brazilian male rowers
Olympic rowers of Brazil
Rowers at the 1932 Summer Olympics
Rowers from Rio de Janeiro (city)